WGKX (105.9 FM, "Kix 106") is a country music formatted radio station in Memphis, Tennessee. It is owned by Cumulus Media.  The station's studios are located at the Memphis Radio Group building in East Memphis, and the transmitter site is in Cordova, Tennessee.

History
The station began in 1968 as WHBQ-FM, sister to WHBQ (AM) 560 AM and WHBQ-TV, Channel 13. It was originally owned by RKO General, until 1972, when it was sold to new owners who flipped the station to easy listening music and adopted the WEZI calls on January 12, 1973. By 1983, after several ownership changes, the station became owned by Barnstable Broadcasting, which adopted the current call letters, format and the name KIX 106.

In February, 1986 Barnstable hired the first known husband/wife team in morning radio, Andy and Debbie Montgomery, who enjoyed top ratings from 1986 until a two-year sabbatical in 1995 when they pursued other radio interests, returning from 1997 until April, 2003.

Citadel Broadcasting bought the station and three others from Barnstable in 2004.

Duane Shannon and Abby Summers, known as Duane and Abby, previously on WOGT Chattanooga, replaced Brian Elder and Jay Young in the morning late in 2010. Duane and Abby are one of the few married morning teams. Citadel merged with Cumulus Media on September 16, 2011.

References

External links

Country radio stations in the United States
GKX
RKO General
Cumulus Media radio stations
Radio stations established in 1968
1968 establishments in Tennessee